The ICC Men's ODI Cricketer of the Year is an annual award presented since 2004 by the International Cricket Council to the best One Day International cricketer. It is one of the annual ICC Awards.

Selection
The recipient of the annual award is selected by an "academy" of 56 individuals (expanded from 50 in 2004), including the current national team captains of the Test-playing nations (10), members of the elite panel of ICC umpires and referees (18), and certain prominent former players and cricket correspondents (28). In the event of a tie in the voting, the award is shared.

List of winners

Superlatives

Wins by player

Wins by country

References

External links

International Cricket Council awards and rankings